The Racair Lil Bitts is a modification of the Micro Mong light biplane to resemble a Pitts Special marketed by Raceair Designs of Gilbert, South Carolina. The aircraft was also supplied by Wings Of Freedom., but by late 2019 the company website had been taken down and it is likely that production had ended.

Development
Ed Fisher developed the Micro Mong in 1993. The Lil Bitts fuselage was welded at the same time with slight modification to resemble a Pitts Special. The project was sold and bought back several times before completion in 2007. The basis for the name Lil Bitts is a combination of 'Pitts' Special, and 'Lil Stinker', the Pitts Special flown by aerobatic performer Betty Skelton. The plans for the aircraft are currently marketed by Raceair.

Design
The Lil Bitts is a single seat biplane with conventional landing gear constructed from welded steel tubing with aircraft fabric covering. The wing spars are constructed of aluminum tubing with aluminum ribs and fabric covering.

Operational history
The Lil Bitts prototype won Experimental-Class Best Fabric award at Sun 'n Fun 2007.

Specifications (Lil Bitts)

See also

References

Homebuilt aircraft